This is a list of airports in the Netherlands, grouped by type and sorted by location.

The largest airport by far is Amsterdam Airport Schiphol, which is the third largest in Europe. Smaller airports with scheduled passenger service are Rotterdam The Hague Airport (formerly known as Zestienhoven), Groningen Airport Eelde, Eindhoven Airport and Maastricht Aachen Airport. De Peel, Valkenburg and Soesterberg have been closed as military airports and are now mainly used by gliders. The future of the former military airport, Twente, is uncertain.

Rarely used helipads without an ICAO indicator, offshore oilrigs and small glider fields are not included in this list. Medical helipads have been assigned the identification codes EH0001 to EH0031 by the Dutch authorities, but these are not official ICAO indicators and thus these helipads are not included in this list. The Maasvlakte and IJmuiden helipads are restricted to maritime piloting services and are not connected to the AFTN network. Air Operations Control Station Nieuw-Milligen is a military air traffic control centre and has a single helipad for military use.

After the dissolution of the Netherlands Antilles the airports on Bonaire, Saba and Sint Eustatius became a part of the Netherlands, however they use the TN prefix instead of EH which is used for other Dutch airports.



Airports 

ICAO location indicators are linked to the airport's Aeronautical Information Publication (AIP) from AIS the Netherlands.

Airport names shown in bold indicate the airport is used by scheduled airlines.

See also
 List of the busiest airports in the Netherlands
 List of airports by ICAO code: E#EH - Netherlands
 List of airports in the Netherlands Antilles
 Transport in the Netherlands
 Wikipedia: WikiProject Aviation/Airline destination lists: Europe#Netherlands

References 

 AIS the Netherlands
 Electronic AIS publications
 
 
  – includes IATA codes
  – IATA and ICAO codes
  – ICAO codes, coordinates, airport data

Netherlands
 
 
Netherlands